Dr. Himanta Biswa Sarma (popularly known as Mama(মামা),born 1 February 1969) is an Indian politician and Lawyer serving as the 15th and current Chief Minister of Assam since 2021. A former member of the Indian National Congress, Sarma joined the Bharatiya Janata Party on 23 August 2015. He is a five time Member of the Assam Legislative Assembly from Jalukbari, having been elected since 2001.He also served as Minister in the Government of Assam from 2016 to 2021,2011 to 2014,2006 to 2011,2002 to 2004 and from 2004 to 2006.The BJP appointed him the convener(leader) of the North-East Democratic Alliance (NEDA) since 2016. 

Sarma studied at Cotton College and later obtained a bachelor of laws from  Government Law College in Guwahati. He later became a solicitor and practised law at Gauhati High Court before his entry to politics.Himanta has also worked in a movie called "Koka Deuta Hati Aru Nati".

Early life and education
Sarma was born on 1 February 1969 in Jorhat, Assam, the family, including six siblings, later shifted to Ulubari, Gandhibasti in Guwahati. He belongs to an Assamese family which traces its origins to Latima in Nalbari district. Sarma married Riniki Bhuyan Sarma in 2001, with whom he has a son, Nandil Biswa Sarma, who attended The Doon School, and a daughter, Sukanya Sarma, who attended Mayo College Girls School.

Sarma was educated at Kamrup Academy School, Guwahati in 1985 and joined Cotton College, Guwahati (now known as Cotton University) for his undergraduate education. He was elected the General Secretary of Cotton College Students Union, serving from 1991 to 1992. Sarma is the seventh chief minister of Assam from Cotton University.

He obtained a Bachelor of Arts in 1990 and Master of Arts in 1992, both in political science, from the university. Thereafter, Sarma obtained a Bachelor of Laws from Government Law College, Guwahati, and became a solicitor in 1995. He practised law at the Gauhati High Court from 1996 to 2001. In 2006, he completed a Doctorate of Philosophy in political science from Gauhati University, defending his dissertation shortly before he was elected to public office.

Political career

Indian National Congress 

Sarma was elected to the Assam Legislative Assembly from Jalukbari for the first time in 2001 when he defeated Asom Gana Parishad leader Bhrigu Kumar Phukan. He was re-elected in 2006, then in 2011 for a third consecutive term with a 78,000 vote margin. Sarma held important portfolios (both state and cabinet) as Minister of State for Agriculture, Planning and Development, Finance, Health, Education, and Assam Accord Implementation from 2002 to 2014.

He was made Cabinet Minister for Health in 2006, and in 2011 he was also entrusted with the additional charge of Education. During his tenure, three medical colleges in Jorhat, Barpeta and Tezpur were built. He also initiated work for five more medical colleges in Diphu, Nagaon, Dhubri, North Lakhimpur and Kokrajhar, which are now in various startup stages.

Bharatiya Janata Party 

After political disagreements with the former chief minister Tarun Gogoi, Sarma resigned from all positions on 21 July 2014. He was a Member of the Legislative Assembly of the Jalukbari constituency until his resignation from the Assembly on 15 September 2015. Sarma joined Bharatiya Janata Party on 23 August 2015 at the residence of Amit Shah at New Delhi. He was appointed as the party's Convener of the Election Management Committee for the upcoming Assembly Elections in the state. In May 2016, Sarma won the Jalukbari constituency for the fourth consecutive term and was sworn in as Cabinet Minister on 24 May in Sonowal ministry, in the first BJP Government in North East India. He was allotted portfolios like Finance, Health & Family Welfare, Education, Planning & Development, Tourism, Pension & Public Grievances.

Sports administrator
On 23 April 2017, Sarma was unanimously elected as President of Badminton Association of India. Sarma has been the president of the Assam Badminton Association. He also became the president of the Assam Cricket Association in June 2016 when his party man Pradip Buragohain became the secretary. Sarma was also the longest-serving vice president of the association serving from 2002 to 2016.

On 25 March 2022, Sarma was re-elected as the president of Badminton Association of India for a second term of four years from 2022 to 2026 in general body meeting in Guwahati.

Chief Minister of Assam

Appointment 
On 8 May 2021, Sarma along with Chief Minister Sarbananda Sonowal were summoned to New Delhi, for discussions on the formation of a new government. Sarma and Sonowal held a series of meetings lasting more than 4 hours with BJP President J P Nadda and Home Minister Amit Shah. On 9 May Sonowal tendered his resignation to Governor Jagadish Mukhi, ahead of a meeting the same day to decide the next Chief Minister. Sarma's name was proposed by the outgoing Sonowal, BJP state president Ranjeet Kumar Dass and newly elected MLA Nandita Garlosa. As no other name was presented to be chief minister, Sarma was unanimously elected as the BJP legislature leader.

On 10 May 2021, Sarma was sworn in as the 15th Chief Minister of Assam by Governor Jagadish Mukhi, succeeding Sonowal. He was congratulated by Prime Minister Narendra Modi on his appointment.

Tenure 
Sarma urged Muslims to adopt decent family planning in June 2021. He also stressed the need for a new law against illegal cattle smuggling in Assam. Mission Basundhara was launched under Sarma in 2021; it aims at helping residents with issues related to land and property. Assam government under his leadership has announced decision of converting 740 Muslim madrasas funded by state to normal "majoritarian" schools.

His tenure experienced a rise in extrajudicial killings, which he has openly supported. His government has demolished many Islamic madrasas in the state, alleging its association with terrorist groups and organizations.

Boundary dispute with Mizoram 

On 26 July 2021 Assam Police and Mizoram Police (Mizoram is an adjacent state to Assam on its southern boundary) fired upon each other supposedly part of the decades-old Assam-Mizoram border dispute. Assam lost six police personnel and a civilian in the firefight, while one youth from Mizoram suffered a gunshot wound. Both sides charged each other with opening fire first.

Reports from news media indicate that on 24 July 2021, Himanta Biswa Sarma and Zoramthanga had a one-to-one talk about the boundary dispute where both agreed to settle the matter amicably through talks. Before this could take place, and only two days after the two Chief Ministers held their talks, this incident took place.

Days after skirmish which left dozens of others injured, the Assam government on 29 July 2021 issued a travel advisory, asking people of the state not to travel to Mizoram - the first such travel advisory ever, by a state in the independent India. Himanta retracted from this advisory a day later. Further, Assam's Home and Political Department said on 29 July that the police should carry out an intensive drive against drugs and check all vehicles entering into Assam from Mizoram.

Controversies

Falsely Accused Dhubri MP's supporter as Pak Supporter
In November 2020, Biswa posted on social media, claiming that supporters of AIUDF Chief and Dhubri MP, Badruddin Ajmal had shouted slogans in support of Pakistan to greet him, on his arrival at Silchar airport. Biswa's claim was reiterated by an Assamese news channel, News Live, which is owned by Biswa's wife, and then also confirmed by several news channels and newspapers, including Times Now, CNN News18, and The New Indian Express. Biswa's posts were flagged by Facebook as misinformation and blocked from being shared, after independent third-party fact-checkers examined videos of the event, and demonstrated that the slogans shouted had consisted of the names of political leaders and not in support of Pakistan. Guwahati Police have since registered a First Information Report and opened a case.

Claimed No need for Mask
In April 2021, Himanta Biswa Sarma claimed that there is no need to wear masks in the state as there is no more coronavirus when India was undergoing the second wave of COVID-19.

Made derogatory remarks against Rahul Gandhi
On 11 February 2022 while addressing a rally at Uttarakhand, Sarma said to Rahul Gandhi, "Did we ever ask you for proof of whether you are Rajiv Gandhi’s son or not?”His statements were criticized by Chief Minister of Telangana, KCR for using derogatory language against and a Member of Parliament and said these derogatory language should not be used by a chief minister of a state.
TPCC president Revanth Reddy filed a complain at Jubilee Hills police station of Hyderabad city., a case has been registered under sections 504 and 505 (2) of the Indian Penal Code against Himanta Biswa Sarma.
 
Revanth Reddy said, "Himanta Biswa Sarma's remarks are humiliating for a woman" and asked   "Why did the Chief Electoral Officer of the National Election Commission not order the arrest of Himanta Biswa Sharma?". "BJP should remove Himanta Biswa from the post of Chief Minister. But the BJP is supporting the remarks of the Assam Chief Minister." Reddy said.

Court related 
Though Sarma was implicated in the Manabendra Sarma case he was acquitted by the court.
 
A Delhi-based advocate from Assam has lodged a complaint with the National Human Rights Commission (NHRC) against the Assam police "on an encounter spree" since Sarma stated in the police conference that police should shoot alleged criminals at legs which are permitted by the law.

Other cases
In an press conference, Sarma said who is Shah Rukh Khan but later when he got a call from SRK he gave assurance on law and order during movie of SRK.

References

External links
 
 
 
 
 

1969 births
Living people
Chief Ministers of Assam
Chief ministers from Bharatiya Janata Party
Indian National Congress politicians from Assam
Members of the Assam Legislative Assembly
Bharatiya Janata Party politicians from Assam
Politicians from Guwahati
Gauhati University alumni
Cotton College, Guwahati alumni
People from Assam
People from Guwahati
People from Kamrup district
State cabinet ministers of Assam
Assam MLAs 2016–2021
Assam MLAs 2006–2011
Assam MLAs 2021–2026
Badminton in India